William Adams Palmer (September 12, 1781December 3, 1860) was an American lawyer and politician. A prominent of the Anti-Masonic Party in the 1830s, he was most notable for his service as a US Senator from Vermont (1818–1825) and the 13th governor of Vermont (1831–1835).

A native of Hebron, Connecticut, Palmer studied law in Hebron before moving to Chelsea, Vermont, where he completed his studies and attained admission to the bar in 1805. He resided in several Vermont towns and attempted to establish a law practice before settling on Danville.

Palmer became active in politics as a Democratic-Republican and served in offices including probate judge of Caledonia County (1807-1808, 1811-1817) and member of the Vermont House of Representatives (1811-1812, 1818). From 1816 to 1818, he served as an associate justice of the Vermont Supreme Court.

In 1818, Palmer was elected to the United States Senate. He served until 1825, and during his term the Democratic-Republicans began to split into adherents of John Quincy Adams and Henry Clay, known as the National Republican Party and Andrew Jackson, knows as the Democratic Party. Palmer became affiliated with the National Republicans.

In 1829, Palmer was an organizer of America's first third party, the Anti-Masonic Party. The Anti-Masons opposed secret societies, especially Masons, who they argued controlled several institutions including the government in defiance of democratic principles. The Anti-Masonic movement was especially strong in Vermont, and in 1831, Palmer was elected governor. He was reelected each year through 1834, and served from October 1831 to October 1835.

After leaving the governorship, Palmer farmed and practiced law in Danville. He served in the Vermont Senate from 1836 to 1837. Palmer died in Danville on December 3, 1860 and was buried at Danville Green Cemetery in Danville.

Biography
Palmer was born in Hebron, Connecticut on September 12, 1781, the son of Stephen Palmer and Susannah (Sawyer) Palmer. He was a descendant of Walter Palmer, a founder of Charlestown, Massachusetts, and New London, Connecticut. During childhood, he lost part of one hand in an accident when he slipped and fell on ice while carrying an axe. He completed his elementary education in Hebron, studied law in Hebron with John Thompson Peters, later a justice of the Connecticut Supreme Court, and then with Daniel Buck in Chelsea, Vermont. Palmer was admitted to the bar in 1805 and practiced in Brownington, Derby, and St. Johnsbury before settling in Danville.

Career
Palmer was elected Probate Judge for Caledonia County from 1807 to 1808, and from 1811 to 1817. He was clerk of the county court from 1807 to 1815, and a member of the Vermont House of Representatives from 1811 to 1812 and again in 1818. He was a judge of the Vermont Supreme Court from 1816 to 1818, and was succeeded by William Brayton. In 1817 Palmer received the honorary degree of Master of Arts from the University of Vermont.

In 1818, Palmer was elected to the United States Senate to fill the vacancy caused by the resignation of James Fisk; was re-elected and served from October 20, 1818 until March 3, 1825; first as a Democratic-Republican and from 1823 as a National Republican. He then returned to the state House of Representatives and to the position of judge. He was also a delegate to the Vermont State Constitutional conventions in 1828, 1836, and 1850.

Palmer organized the first convention of Vermont's Anti-Masonic Party in Montpelier in 1829. He was elected Governor of Vermont in 1831 on the Anti-Masonic ticket and stayed in office until 1835. He proposed the 1833 law that any person administering a secret oath in any organization such as the Masons would be fined, and advocated the 1834 law to suspend the charter of Vermont's Grand Lodge. During his tenure, imprisonment of females for debt was abolished, fourteen new schools were established, seven new banks were chartered, and legislation was enacted to expand the railway system.

Palmer retired to his farm, but continued to be politically active. As a Democrat, he was elected to the Vermont Senate in 1836 and he served from 1836 to 1837.

Death
Palmer died in Danville on December 3, 1860. He was buried at Danville Green Cemetery in Danville.

Family
In 1813, Palmer married Sarah Chandler Blanchard of Danville. They were the parents of seven children. Five survived to adulthood, including William B., Abial C., Henry W., Frank R., and Edward.

References

External links
Vermont State Archives
Biographical Directory of the United States Congress
National Governors Association
The Political Graveyard

1781 births
1860 deaths
People from Hebron, Connecticut
People from Danville, Vermont
American people of English descent
Members of the Vermont House of Representatives
Vermont state senators
Democratic-Republican Party United States senators from Vermont
National Republican Party United States senators from Vermont
Vermont Democratic-Republicans
Vermont Democrats
Vermont National Republicans
Anti-Masonic Party politicians from Vermont
Governors of Vermont
Anti-Masonic Party state governors of the United States
Justices of the Vermont Supreme Court
University of Vermont alumni
Burials in Vermont
19th-century American judges